Trash Inc: The Secret Life of Garbage is a one-hour television documentary film that aired on CNBC on September 29, 2010 about trash/garbage, what happens to it when it's "thrown away", and its impact on the world. The film is hosted by CNBC Squawk Box co-anchor Carl Quintanilla as he reports from various landfills (such as the largest in the United States, the Apex Landfill in Clark County, Nevada), business, and other locations in the United States (New York, New Jersey, Hawaii, South Carolina) and China (mostly Beijing).

The idea for Trash, Inc was born of the 2008 recession and the relative stability of publicly traded waste management companies.

References

External links
 

CNBC original programming
American documentary television films
Waste
2010 in the environment
2010 television films
2010 films
Documentary films about environmental issues
2010s English-language films
2010s American films